Farm to Market Road 1092 (FM 1092) is a state highway in the U.S. state of Texas that is within both Fort Bend and Harris Counties. The highway starts from State Highway 6 (SH 6) in Missouri City and goes north to Interstate 69/U.S. Route 59 in southwest Houston. The divided highway is also known as Murphy Road along its entire length.

Route description
FM 1092 starts at a four-way traffic signal on SH 6 in Missouri City. From the intersection, the four-lane divided highway goes a short distance to the northeast then turns directly north for almost its entire length. The extension of the road to the southwest of the SH 6 intersection is called South University Boulevard. FM 1092 crosses a bridge over Oyster Creek and continues north  to a traffic signal at FM 3345 (Cartwright Road). From US 90A the now six-lane divided highway continues north past intersections at Cash Road, Mula Road and West Airport Drive. Halfway between West Airport and I-69/US 59, FM 1092 crosses into Harris County. About  before the highway ends at the I-69/US 59 Southwest Freeway overpass, FM 1092 turns to the northwest. The extension of the highway north of the Southwest Freeway is called Wilcrest Drive.

History
At that time, the highway was entirely within Fort Bend County. On September 20, 1961, FM 1092 was extended  from US 59 north to a proposed new US 59 (now dual signed as I-69/US 59) route known as the Southwest Freeway. A 1955 United States Geological Survey map of Sugar Land shows that US 59 shared its right-of-way through Sugar Land and Stafford with US 90A. In 2013, only US 90A used the 1955 right-of-way.

On June 27, 1995, the entire route was redesignated Urban Road 1092 (UR 1092). The designation reverted to FM 1092 with the elimination of the Urban Road system on November 15, 2018.

Major intersections

Gallery

See also

Notes

1092
Transportation in Fort Bend County, Texas
Transportation in Harris County, Texas